Nikita Gennadievich Nazarov (born 14 May 1998) is a Russian competitive ice dancer. With his former skating partner, Elizaveta Khudaiberdieva, he is the 2019 World Junior silver medalist and the 2018–19 Junior Grand Prix Final bronze medalist. He has also won four ISU Junior Grand Prix medals, including gold medals at 2018 JGP Slovakia and 2018 JGP Czech Republic.

Personal life 
Nikita Nazarov was born on 5 May 1998 in Ryazan, Russia.

Career

Early career 
Nazarov began learning to skate in 2006. He focused in ice dancing very early on and he competed ice dancing already season 2009–2010 season with his first partner Ekaterina Lautova. He later teamed up with Anastasia Skoptsova with whom he skated two seasons from 2010 to 2012. In 2012 he teamed up with Daria Shirokhova with whom he skated three seasons from 2012 to 2015. He then teamed up with his current partner Elizaveta Khudaiberdieva with whom he started to compete together in 2016–2017 season. They are coached by Denis Samokhin and Maria Borovikova.

2016–2017 season 
Khudaiberdieva/Nazarov made their international junior debut in January 2017 at the 2017 Toruń Cup where they won the gold medal.

They placed 8th at the 2017 Russian Junior Championships.

2017–2018 season 
Khudaiberdieva/Nazarov received their first ISU Junior Grand Prix (JGP) assignments in the 2017–2018 season. They won medals at both JGP events, first a bronze medal in late August in Brisbane, Australia and then the silver medal in October in Gdańsk, Poland.

They placed fifth at the 2018 Russian Junior Championships after placing second in the short dance and sixth in the free dance.

2018–2019 season 
Khudaiberdieva/Nazarov won their first JGP gold medal in August at the 2018 JGP event in Bratislava, Slovakia, after placing first in both the rhythm dance and the free dance. They scored their personal best score of 159.62 points and they beat the silver medalists, Elizaveta Shanaeva / Devid Naryzhnyy, by about seven points. Their rhythm dance, free dance and combined total scores at this competition were the highest scores achieved in an international junior ice dance competition at the time, subsequently surpassed by others.

At their second JGP event of the season in Ostrava, Czech Republic, they won a second gold medal. Again they were ranked first in both the rhythm dance and the free dance. With two JGP gold medals they qualified for the 2018–19 Junior Grand Prix Final.  At the Final, Khudaiberdieva/Nazarov won the bronze medal after placing third in the rhythm dance and fourth in the free dance. They were part of a Russian sweep of the ice dance podium. Khudaiberdieva/Nazarov were about 6 points behind both the gold medalists, Sofia Shevchenko / Igor Eremenko and the silver medalists, Arina Ushakova / Maxim Nekrasov, who were separated by only a 0.01 point. Khudaiberdieva/Nazarov won the bronze medal over Marjorie Lajoie / Zachary Lagha, who placed fourth, by a margin of only 0.03 points.

After winning the bronze medal at the 2019 Russian Junior Championships, Khudaiberdieva/Nazarov concluded the season at the 2019 World Junior Championships.  They placed second in the rhythm dance, winning a silver small medal and unexpectedly beating their Russian teammates due to superior results on the tango pattern dance.  They came fourth in the free dance, but remained in second place overall, winning the silver medal.  Khudaiberdieva said the result was not something they had expected, as "we were the number three Russian team, a confident number three though. For us, it was more about overcoming ourselves than anyone else. We haven’t realized yet that we are second at our first Junior Worlds."  Noting that it was their final junior season, Nazarov said "there are many teams in Russia, but if you look at the results at major events, they are not that great.  But all these teams also once came up from juniors. We just have to work very hard in order to achieve something."

On May 13, 2019, it was announced that Khudaiberdieva and Nazarov had split.

2019–2020 season 

It was announced on June 8, 2020, that Nazarov began working with Alena Kanysheva, who recently switched from ladies' singles to ice dance.

Programs

With Khudaiberdieva

With Shirokhova

Records and achievements 
(with Khudaiberdieva)
 
 Set the junior-level ice dancing record of the new +5 / -5 GOE (Grade of Execution) system for the combined total (159.62 points), rhythm dance (64.39 points) and free dance (95.23 points) at the 2018 JGP Slovakia.

Competitive highlights 
JGP: Junior Grand Prix

With Khudaiberdieva

With Shirokhova

With Skoptsova

Detailed results 
Small medals for short and free programs awarded only at ISU Championships.

With Khudaiberdieva

References

External links 
 

! colspan="3" style="border-top: 5px solid #78FF78;" |World Junior Record Holders

1998 births
Russian male ice dancers
World Junior Figure Skating Championships medalists
Living people
Sportspeople from Ryazan